Rosebud Township may refer to the following townships in the United States:

 Rosebud Township, Polk County, Minnesota
 Rosebud Township, Barnes County, North Dakota